Katla Geopark is the first Geopark to be designated in Iceland, having gained membership of both the European Geoparks Network and the UNESCO-assisted Global Network of National Geoparks in 2011.

Amongst others, it includes the volcanoes Katla and Eyjafjallajökull, the latter renowned for the disruption which its eruption in 2010 caused to European air travel.

External links
 official website of Katla Geopark
 official website of the European Geoparks Network

References

Geoparks in Europe
Protected areas of Iceland
Global Geoparks Network members